The 42nd Signal Battalion "Pordoi" is an inactive signals battalion of the Italian Army. The unit was formed in 1953 as a battalion, which operated and maintained the army's telecommunication network in the Friuli Venezia Giulia, Trentino-Südtirol, and Veneto regions. In 1975 the battalion was named for the Pordoi Pass and received its own flag. In 1993 the battalion was disbanded and its personnel and tasks transferred to the 32nd Signal Regiment. In 2001 the battalion was reformed as the second signal battalion of the deployable 2nd Alpine Signal Regiment.

History 
On 1 October 1953 the Territorial Signal Battalion was formed in Padua with the personnel and materiel of the existing 5th Territorial Signal Company. The battalion consisted of a command, a command company, the 1st and 2nd radio operations companies, a phone line operations company, a signal center, and two dovecotes in Padua and Mantua. The battalion was assigned to the V Territorial Military Command.

On 1 October 1957 the battalion was renamed XLII Signal Battalion and received the personnel and materiel of the disbanded 4th Territorial Signal Company. The battalion consisted now of a command, a command and services platoon, and four signal companies, one of which was detached to Bolzano.

During the 1975 army reform the army disbanded the regimental level and newly independent battalions were granted for the first time their own flags. During the reform signal battalions were renamed for mountain passes. On 15 October 1975 the XLII Signal Battalion was renamed to 42nd Signal Battalion "Pordoi". The battalion consisted of a command, a command and services platoon, and four signal companies, one of which was detached to Bolzano. The battalion was assigned to the Signal Command of the Northeastern Military Region and operated and maintained the army's telecommunication network in the Friuli-Venezia Giulia, Trentino-Alto Adige, and Veneto regions and the two Lombardy provinces of Brescia and Mantova. On 12 November 1976 the battalion was granted a flag by decree 846 of the President of the Italian Republic Giovanni Leone.

Ath the end of 1989 the command and services platoon was expanded to command and services company. On 18 September 1993 the battalion was disbanded and its personnel transferred to the 32nd Signal Regiment. On 21 September 1993 the flag of the 42nd Signal Battalion "Pordoi" was transferred to the Shrine of the Flags in the Vittoriano in Rome.

On 26 September 2001 the battalion was reformed as Battalion "Pordoi" and assigned to the 2nd Signal Regiment as the regiment's second signal battalion.

References

Signal Regiments of Italy